An Danzza is an independent Spanish folk project from Madrid, Spain produced by Andrés Campuzano with lead singer Haydée Mariñoso. Its music is mostly neofolk but also spans metal and neoclassical.

He has been active since 2004, and released his first album "Last Autumn Tears" in 2010. He have since released 6 more albums (as of December 2018), 1 EP  and 5 metal singles (as a side project).

The project is strongly inspired by the many pagan traditions of Europe. Their works feature mythology both old and new, from Celtic mythology, Norse mythology and Classical mythology to J.R.R. Tolkien's legendarium.

The songs are varied, using many different instruments, most commonly the tambourine, didgeridoo, traditional drums, guitar, flute, harp. Lyrics are usually sung in English, except for the 2011 album "Canción de Los Juncos", which is entirely sung in Spanish by Macarena Martín. A wide range of vocalists have featured in An Danzza's albums and singles throughout the years, with Haydée Mariñoso being the lead vocalist.
The project was first brought to the stage in 2016 with a band, offering several concerts and recording a video clip for Beltane song.
In December 2018 Andrés continues his work in the studio and  The Claws of Dawn is published, an album with 15 songs full of fantasy and folk sounds: the music travels between two worlds: life and death, reality and fantasy, light and darkness.

Albums
 Last Autumn Tears (2010)
 Canción de Los Juncos (2011)
 Tierra de Andanzas (2013)
 Scintilla (2014)
 Whispers of the Forest (2016)
 The Spooky Circle (2017)
 The Claws of Dawn (2018)

Metal Singles
 Gods Of My Fathers (2014)
 Open Your Eyes (2014)
 Fallen Heroes (2015)
 Gorgon Queen (2015)
 See You In Valhalla (2015)

References

External links
 Youtube: 
 Facebook: 
 Twitter: 
 Bandcamp: 

2004 establishments in Spain